The Co-operative Family Credit Union Limited is a not-for-profit member-owned financial co-operative, based in Manchester and operating throughout the United Kingdom. Members elect the directors, vote on share dividend and can become actively involved as volunteers.

Established in 1998, the credit union is a member of the Association of British Credit Unions. In 2012, it adopted the national co-operative brand.

History

In 1997, the Head of Strategy at The Co-operative Group, approached the Manchester Headquarters Staff Council with a proposal that it act as a steering group to oversee the creation of a credit union for employees of the various members of "the co-operative family" in Greater Manchester.

The Co-op Group provided premises at the Old Bank Building (the former office of the bank's chief executive) in Hanover Street, Manchester, and, by 2004, the credit union had lent over £3,500,000 with almost 2,000 members, making it one of the fastest growing credit unions in the UK.

In 2014, the credit union was awarded a grant of £100,000 by the Lloyds Banking Group Credit Union Development Fund to support its reserves and allow it to bring forward plans for growth.

Activities
Members of the credit union save regularly every month, forming a pool of money which is lent by way of loans at reasonable rates of interest.

Membership of The Co-op Credit Union is restricted by common bond to employees, pensioners and members of a range of co-operative organisations promoting and offering credit union membership as a benefit. Family members are also eligible to join provided they are living at the same address.

Products
The Co-op Credit Union runs a payroll deduction savings and loans scheme in conjunction with The Co-op Group and participating regional societies. The credit union is responsible for the operation of the scheme, with the employer facilitating monthly deductions from salary. Members who are not paid through a co-operative society can make contributions by standing order.

Instead of paying a fixed rate of interest on savings balances, credit unions return any surplus profit to members. Depending on reserves, shares are eligible for an annual dividend. Life savings and loan protection insurance is also offered at no cost to members.

Registered under the Industrial and Provident Societies Acts, The Co-operative Family Credit Union is authorised by the Prudential Regulation Authority and regulated by the Financial Conduct Authority and PRA. Ultimately, like the banks and building societies, members' savings are protected against business failure by the Financial Services Compensation Scheme.

The Friends of The Co-operative Credit Union Lottery is a private lottery for members, drawn on the first Tuesday of each month.

See also
Credit unions in the United Kingdom
The Co-operative Group

References

External links
The Co-operative Credit Union
Association of British Credit Unions

Credit unions of the United Kingdom
Banks established in 1998
Companies based in Manchester
Financial services companies of the United Kingdom
Financial services companies established in 1998
1998 establishments in England
British companies established in 1998